Eduard Anselm Freiherr von Rotberg (1799 – 1884) was a Bavarian general. He was acting as War Minister of the kingdom for a short time in 1866.

References and notes 

Bavarian Ministers of War
Bavarian generals
People from the Kingdom of Bavaria
1799 births
1884 deaths